Blydenburgh Park Historic District is a national historic district located at Smithtown in Suffolk County, New York.  The district includes eight contributing buildings and one contributing structure.  There are two groups of historic buildings: the mill complex and Blydenburgh Farmhouse and related buildings.

It was added to the National Register of Historic Places in 1983.

References

External links
Suffolk County Department of Parks:
Blydenburgh County Park
Blydenburgh Farm and New Mills Historic District

Historic districts on the National Register of Historic Places in New York (state)
Gothic Revival architecture in New York (state)
Historic districts in Suffolk County, New York
National Register of Historic Places in Suffolk County, New York